Ilombe Mboyo (born 22 April 1987) is a professional footballer who plays as a striker for Virton. Born in the Democratic Republic of the Congo and raised in Belgium, Mboyo originally represented DR Congo internationally before switching to represent the Belgium national team.

Club career
Born in Kinshasa, DR Congo, Mboyo played youth football for Anderlecht and Club Brugge,
before going to prison when he was 17 for his part in a gang rape of a 14-year-old girl in 2004. Mboyo was a member of one of the most notorious street gangs in Belgium. While in prison, Mboyo was scouted under an initiative started by Queen Paola of Belgium and trained with Charleroi, joining the club after his release, signed by John Collins. He joined Kortrijk on loan in May 2010; the deal was made permanent in September 2010 He moved to Gent in January 2011.

He quickly became an important player for Gent and received the captain's armband. Two months later, however, in a game against Waasland-Beveren, Mboyo missed a carelessly taken penalty and provoked his own supporters after being booed. The club forced him to apologize for his behaviour and youngster Hannes van der Bruggen became the new captain.

In August 2013, West Ham United pulled out of signing Mboyo after fans protested due to his conviction.

On 3 February 2019, Al-Raed has signed Mboyo for one seasons from Kortrijk.

In January 2021, Mboyo joined fellow Belgian First Division A side Sint-Truiden on a permanent deal.

On 31 August 2021, he returned to Gent on a two-year contract.

On 26 December 2022, Mboyo signed with Virton.

Career statistics

International career
In August 2011 Mboyo played for the DR Congo national team in the 3–0 defeat against Gambia. However, as this was a friendly game, he remained eligible for Belgium. 
In October 2012, Mboyo was called up to the senior Belgium national team. Due to his conviction, the selection was controversial. Assistant manager Vital Borkelmans said that he deserved a second chance, while François De Keersmaecker, President of the Royal Belgian Football Association, said that his presence could set a good example. He made his debut on the 16th in a 2–0 win over Scotland in 2014 FIFA World Cup qualification, replacing Christian Benteke for the final four minutes at the King Baudouin Stadium in Brussels.

References

External links
 
 

1987 births
Footballers from Kinshasa
Belgian people of Democratic Republic of the Congo descent
Democratic Republic of the Congo emigrants to Belgium
Living people
Democratic Republic of the Congo footballers
Democratic Republic of the Congo international footballers
Belgian footballers
Belgium international footballers
Association football forwards
Dual internationalists (football)
Club Brugge KV players
R. Charleroi S.C. players
K.V. Kortrijk players
K.A.A. Gent players
K.R.C. Genk players
FC Sion players
Cercle Brugge K.S.V. players
Al-Raed FC players
Sint-Truidense V.V. players
URSL Visé players
R.E. Virton players
Belgian Pro League players
Swiss Super League players
Swiss Promotion League players
Challenger Pro League players
Saudi Professional League players
Belgian National Division 1 players
Belgian expatriate footballers
Democratic Republic of the Congo expatriate footballers
Expatriate footballers in Switzerland
Democratic Republic of the Congo expatriate sportspeople in Switzerland
Belgian expatriate sportspeople in Switzerland
Expatriate footballers in Saudi Arabia
Democratic Republic of the Congo expatriate sportspeople in Saudi Arabia
Belgian expatriate sportspeople in Saudi Arabia
21st-century criminals
Belgian prisoners and detainees
Belgian people convicted of rape
Prisoners and detainees of Belgium